Richard Michael "Kip" Carpenter (14 August 1929 – 26 February 2012) was an English screenwriter, author, and actor who created a number of British television series, including Robin of Sherwood and Catweazle.

Early life
Born in King's Lynn, Norfolk, Carpenter attended the Old Vic Theatre School before starting an acting career by working in repertory theatre.

Career
Carpenter appeared in occasional films, but was mostly active on British TV in the 1960s as a character actor, on one occasion opposite Tony Hancock in one of his last shows for the BBC, commonly known as "The Bowmans". Other TV shows in which he appeared in the 1960s included Z-Cars, Dixon of Dock Green, Gideon's Way, Sherlock Holmes and The Baron.

In 1969, Carpenter created Catweazle, the children's series about an unfortunate wizard from the 11th century who is accidentally transported to the present day. This changed the course of his career substantially. Carpenter earned international recognition and a Writers' Guild award for creating the cult children's TV series.

During the 1970s, he wrote the series The Ghosts of Motley Hall (1976–1978), Dick Turpin (1979–1982), parts of the series The Famous Five and Doctor Snuggles, and 17 episodes of The Adventures of Black Beauty for ITV; and Cloud Burst, The Boy from Space and The King's Dragon as part of BBC's Look and Read (1967–2004) programme for schools, He presented all episodes of "Cloud Burst".

In the 1980s came the historical adventures Smuggler and its later antipodean-based follow-up Adventurer and between them, the lavish HTV production Robin of Sherwood, which ran for three series. 
As Anthony Hayward wrote in this cited obituary:

  Carpenter re-imagined the Robin Hood legend in Robin of Sherwood (1984–86). Mysticism was one of its distinctive ingredients, reflecting a renewed interest in paganism, as well as the concerns of the growing environmental movement and – through the idealism of the hero

Carpenter then worked on a number of series for children and families in the 1990s (The Winjin' Pom, Stanley's Dragon and Out of Sight), some of which (The Borrowers, The Return of the Borrowers and The Scarlet Pimpernel) were based on classic novels.

Carpenter wrote novelisations of many of the early series he created: Catweazle, Cloud Burst, The Ghosts of Motley Hall, Smuggler, Robin of Sherwood (two books) and two books of Dick Turpin.

Personal life
Carpenter married Annabelle Lee in 1954. They lived in Ayot Bury, Ayot St Peter near Welwyn in Hertfordshire, had two children and remained married until his death.

Death
On 26 February 2012, at the age of 82, Carpenter died in Hertfordshire from a pulmonary embolism.

Filmography
Tarnished Heroes (1961) – Freddy
H.M.S. Defiant (1962) – Lieut. Ponsonby
The Password Is Courage (1962) – Robinson
Mystery Submarine (1963) – Lt. Haskins
Wings of Mystery (1963) – Ted
Clash by Night (1964) – Danny Watts
The Terrornauts (1967) – Danny

References

Bibliography

Works by Richard Carpenter in English

Catweazle, illustrated by George Adamson (Puffin, 1970) 
Catweazle and the Magic Zodiac, illustrated by George Adamson (Puffin, 1971) 
The Best of Black Beauty (Everest, 1975) 
Cloud Burst, illustrated by Trevor Ridley (BBC, 1976) 
The Ghosts of Motley Hall (Puffin, 1977) 
Dick Turpin (Armada, 1979) 
Turpin and Swiftnick, illustrated by Peter Archer (Armada, 1980) 
Smuggler (Armada, 1981) 
Robin of Sherwood (Puffin, 1984) 
Robin of Sherwood: The Time of the Wolf (Puffin, 1988) 
The Complete Adventures of Robin of Sherwood (Omnibus of all four novelisations, Puffin, 1990)

Novelisations of Carpenter's work by other authors

Robin of Sherwood and the Hounds of Lucifer by Robin May (Puffin, 1985) 
Robin of Sherwood: The Hooded Man by Anthony Horowitz (Puffin, 1986)  
Winjin' Pom by Terrance Dicks (Macmillan, 1991)

Works by Richard Carpenter in translation
 Catweazle, de Tovernaar van Saburac (transl. into Dutch of Catweazle), illustrated by George Adamson (Amsterdam: van Holkema & Warendorf, 1971)  
 Catweazle, de Tekens van de Dierenriem (transl. into Dutch of Catweazle and the Magic Zodiac), illustrated by George Adamson (Amsterdam: van Holkema & Warendorf, 1971) 
 Kaksnoukka ja Porkkana (transl. by Marikki Makkonen into Finnish of Catweazle), illustrated by George Adamson (WSOY [Werner Söderström Corporation], 1974), Nuorten toivekirjasto 215 
 Kaksnoukka ja Taivaan Merkit (transl. by Marikki Makkonen into Finnish of Catweazle and the Magic Zodiac), illustrated by George Adamson (WSOY), Nuorten toivekirjasto 228 
 Catweazle (transl. into German by Sybil Gräfin Schönfeldt of Catweazle), illustrated by George Adamson (Ravensburger, 1973) RTB 39262
 Catweazle sucht die magische Zeichen (transl. into German by Sybil Gräfin Schönfeldt of Catweazle and the Magic Zodiac), illustrated by George Adamson (Ravensburger, 1974) RTB 39330 
 Catweazle (transl. into German by Sybil Gräfin Schönfeldt of Catweazle), illustrated by Carsten Teich (Ravensburger) 
 Catweazle sucht die magische Zeichen (transl. into German by Sybil Gräfin Schönfeldt of Catweazle and the Magic Zodiac), illustrated by Carsten Teich (Ravensburger, 2006) 
 Den Merkelige Mannen (transl. into Norwegian Bokmål by Fredrik Chr. Brøgger of Catweazle), illustrated by George Adamson (Oslo: Cappelin, 1971)
 Mathilde Cachebidon, super-robot (Doctor Snuggles) (transl. into French by Philippe Mikriammos) (Hachette, 1981) 
 La Grande course en ballon (Doctor Snuggles) (transl. into French by Philippe Mikriammos) (Hachette, 1981) 
 Les aventures de Dick le rebelle (transl. by Odile Ricklin), (Paris: G.P., 1981) 
 Turpin et feu follet (transl. by Odile Ricklin), (Paris: G.P., 1981)

External links
The Original Catweazle Website, launched in 1997 

Interviews in Sherwood – Richard Carpenter

1929 births
2012 deaths
English television writers
English male television actors
People from King's Lynn
Deaths from pulmonary embolism
British male television writers